Faraoni (trans. The Pharaohs) are a Slovenian and Yugoslav rock and pop band formed in Izola in 1967. 

Faraoni started their career performing covers of foreign beat and pop rock hits, before moving towards rhythm and blues. In the 1970s the band moved towards progressive rock, disbanding in 1972. In 1986 original Faraoni drummer Nelfi Depanger reformed the band. The new incarnation of Faraoni is still active performing pop music. Although they were not among the earliest Yugoslav rock bands, Faraoni, as other Yugoslav 1960s rock bands, played a pioneering role on the Yugoslav rock scene.

History

1967–1972
Faraoni were formed at the end of 1967 in Izola by Stojan Družina (guitar), Đani Kolori (rhythm guitar), Črt Janovski (bass guitar) and Nelfi Depanger (drums). During the first year of their activity, organist Tine Guzelj occasionally performed with them. At the beginning of their career, Faraoni performed covers of foreign beat and pop rock hits, and later moved towards rhythm and blues, managing to gain local popularity.

In the summer of 1968, Kolori was replaced by Marjan Malikovič, formely of the band Kameleoni. Soon after, they were joined by another former Kameleoni drummer, Tulio Furlančič, so for a period of time they performed with two drummers. Družina and Depanger left the band in 1970, Faraoni continuing as a trio and moving towards progressive rock. In the summer of 1970 they released the EP Berač (Picker) through Jugoton and performed for a month in the club Simonida in Belgrade. At the beginning of 1971 they were joined by Bulgarian organist Georgij Krestanov. However, after failing to gain larger attention of the public, Faraoni disbanded at the beginning of 1972.

1981 reunion, 1986-present
In the summer of 1981, Faraoni made a one-off reunion to perform with Kameleoni on a concert in Portorož. In 1986 Depanger reformed the band with new members: Enzo Horvatin (guitar), Piero Poček (bass guitar) and Ferdo Maraž (keyboards). The new incarnation of Faraoni is still active, performing pop music. They recorded eight studio albums and often performed as a backing band for Croatian pop singer Oliver Dragojević.

Discography

Studio albums
Faraoni (1988)
Tu je moj dom (1992)
Naj te morje (1994)
Stari časi (1995)
Sem takšen, ker sem živ (1996)
Kar tako (1999)
Solinar (2002)
Skupaj (2007)

Live albums
V živo! (San Simon, 20. 8. 1997) (1997)

EPs
Berač (1970)

Compilation albums
Vol 1. (2004)
Best of Vol 2. (2014)

References

External links 
Faraoni at Discogs

Slovenian rock music groups
Slovenian progressive rock groups
Slovenian pop music groups
Yugoslav rock music groups
Yugoslav rhythm and blues musical groups
Yugoslav progressive rock groups
Beat groups
Musical groups established in 1967